Fair Wear Foundation (Fair Wear) is an independent multi-stakeholder organisation that works with garment brands, garment workers and industry influencers to improve labour conditions in garment factories. Receiving the Fair Wear stamp of approval does not guarantee any existing quality of labour standards, instead only demonstrating a stated interest in working toward improvement.

Garment Brands
Fair Wear collaborates with brands that profess an interest in finding a fairer way to make their clothes. Fair Wear has over 80 member companies representing over 130 garment brands from 10 European countries. When a member brand joins Fair Wear, it expresses a commitment to implementing the eight Fair Wear labour standards in their supply chain.

Fair Wear's work is based on a ‘shared responsibility' approach. Namely, each actor in the supply chain of a certain product is responsible for the conditions in which the product is made. Management decisions of a brand selling clothes in Europe have a huge influence on factory conditions in distant garment-producing countries. The two cannot be separated.

Fair Wear Labour Standards
The Fair Wear Code of Labour Practices contains eight labour standards that are based on the conventions of the International Labour Organization (ILO) and the Universal Declaration on Human Rights. The Fair Wear Code of Labour Practices is known for its strong provisions on freedom of association, hours of work, and a living wage. It is important to note, however, that none of these practices are mandated for claiming association with Fair Wear.

Fair Wear's eight labour standards are:

 Employment is freely chosen
 There is no discrimination in employment
 No exploitation of child labour
 Freedom of association and the right to collective bargaining
 Payment of a living wage
 No excessive working hours
 Safe and healthy working conditions
 Legally binding employment relationship

Production countries 
Fair Wear is active in 11 production countries: Bangladesh, Bulgaria, China, India, Indonesia, Myanmar, Macedonia, Romania, Tunisia, Turkey and Vietnam. In all countries, Fair Wear has local audit teams and trainers who are in close contact with the Amsterdam headquarters office. 

Fair Wear also constantly liaises with many different and in-country organisations, such as trade unions, other NGOs, and governments.

Tools to Create Change
Fair Wear encourages change by conducting brand performance checks, audits, training, and by operating complaints helplines in 11 countries.

Brand performance checks 
The Fair Wear Brand Performance Checks help brands determine what they are doing well and where they can improve to create positive change. Fair Wear shares the results with the public.

Audits 
During a Fair Wear audit, a worker interviewer, a documents inspector and a health and safety specialist work toward discovering underlying problems. The team is always made up of local specialists. After the audit, the team discusses steps for improvement with the member brand and factory management. The member brand and factory management then create a concrete action plan with a clear timeframe for execution. 

At Fair Wear, an audit is seen as the starting point. From there, the member brand and factory work together to make concrete improvements. This collaboration is necessary for successful remediation. No information is provided by Fair Wear as to enforcement of the decided-upon timeframes or penalties for failure to live up to action plans.

Workplace education programmes 
To support brands and factories in fulfilling their basic responsibility to inform workers and management about workers' rights and access to grievance systems, Fair Wear has designed several types of training for different countries.

Complaints helplines 
Fair Wear offers complaints helplines in 11 garment producing countries. When a garment worker lodges a complaint, Fair Wear launches an investigation and requires the brand to work with the supplier to remediate the problem.

Criticisms 
Fair Wear does not certify products, brands, or factories, relying instead on a "process approach" that claims to insist on constant progress toward the standards it supports. A factory was investigated by Fair Wear after having been exposed as relying on exploitative labour centres that grossly violate their standards. Further, research has shown that self-regulated codes of conduct (specifically and explicitly those of Fair Wear) provide "few significant results... for specific worker rights."

Cooperation 
Fair Wear also creates change beyond its member brands’ supply chains. Fair Wear works with a range of stakeholders and other organisations in order to develop sustainable systems for good workplace conditions. Fair Wear works on enabling an influencing environment for multiple actors: governments, international organisations, UN bodies, and stakeholders. Fair Wear provides evidence to other brands and industry influencers of what a fairer garment industry could look like.

Fair Wear brings different players together at every level – from boardroom decisions to workplace assessments – so that brands, business associations, trade unions, governments and NGOs all have a voice.

History 
Fair Wear was founded in 1999. Just as in other countries, garment production in the Netherlands had, by then, been displaced to low-wage countries. After some years of campaigning against poor labour conditions in low-wage countries, the union FNV and the CCC contacted the employers' organisations and proposed a joint initiative to improve labour conditions in the garment sector.

In the period 1999–2002, Fair Wear carried out pilot projects on the implementation of the Code of Labour Practices with four Dutch companies. These experiences led to the determination of a standard procedure.

Building up membership among companies was the next step. The first group of 11 members was announced to the public in March 2003. 

In 2019, Fair Wear employs over 50 employees located in Amsterdam, as well as local teams in garment-producing countries.

See also 
International Labour Organization
Labour law
Labor rights
Sweatshop

References

External links 
Fair Wear Foundation FWF
Fair Wear Formula Animated Film on YouTube
Modint - Employers Organization for Garment Suppliers
CBW-Mitex - Employers Organiza t Garment Retail Trade
FNV Bondgenoten - Trade Union
CNV - Trade Union
Bread for All - Switzerland 
Clean Clothes Campaign

Fair trade organizations
International economic organizations
Textile organizations
Organizations established in 1999
International organisations based in the Netherlands
1999 establishments in the Netherlands